This is a list of electoral results for the Electoral district of Yilgarn-Dundas in Western Australian state elections.

Members for Yilgarn-Dundas

Election results

Elections in the 1980s

Elections in the 1970s

References

Western Australian state electoral results by district